Arvicanthini is a tribe of muroid rodents in the subfamily Murinae. Almost all recent species in this tribe are or were found in Africa aside from one species, the Indian bush rat (Golunda ellioti), which is found in South Asia and Iran. However, some fossil Golunda species from India and the genus Parapelomys (known to have inhabited Arabia and Pakistan) are thought to have also occurred outside Africa, and one species in the fossil genus Saidomys may have also occurred in Afghanistan.

The genus Canariomys inhabited the Canary Islands until being driven to extinction by early human settlers.

Species

Extant species 
Species in the tribe include:

 Aethomys division
 Genus Aethomys - bush rats
 Bocage's rock rat, Aethomys bocagei
 Red rock rat, Aethomys chrysophilus
 Grant's rock rat, Aethomys (Micaelamys) granti
 Hinde's rock rat, Aethomys hindei
 Tete veld aethomys, Aethomys ineptus
 Kaiser's rock rat, Aethomys kaiseri
 Namaqua rock rat, Aethomys (Micaelamys) namaquensis
 Nyika rock rat, Aethomys nyikae
 Silinda rock rat, Aethomys silindensis
 Tinfields rock rat, Aethomys stannarius
 Thomas's rock rat, Aethomys thomasi
 Arvicanthis division
 Genus Arvicanthis - unstriped grass mice
 Abyssinian grass rat, Arvicanthis abyssinicus
 Sudanian grass rat, Arvicanthis ansorgei
 Blick's grass rat, Arvicanthis blicki
 Nairobi grass rat, Arvicanthis nairobae
 Neumann's grass rat, Arvicanthis neumanni
 African grass rat, Arvicanthis niloticus
 Guinean grass rat, Arvicanthis rufinus
 Genus Desmomys
 Harrington's rat, Desmomys harringtoni
 Yalden's rat, Desmomys yaldeni
 Genus Lemniscomys - striped grass mice
 Barbary striped grass mouse, Lemniscomys barbarus
 Bellier's striped grass mouse, Lemniscomys bellieri
 Griselda's striped grass mouse, Lemniscomys griselda
 Hoogstraal's striped grass mouse, Lemniscomys hoogstraali
 Senegal one-striped grass mouse, Lemniscomys linulus
 Buffoon striped grass mouse, Lemniscomys macculus
 Mittendorf's striped grass mouse, Lemniscomys mittendorfi
 Single-striped grass mouse, Lemniscomys rosalia
 Rosevear's striped grass mouse, Lemniscomys roseveari
 Typical striped grass mouse, Lemniscomys striatus
 Heuglin's striped grass mouse, Lemniscomys zebra
 Genus Mylomys (African Groove-toothed Rat)
 African groove-toothed rat, Mylomys dybowskii
 Ethiopian mylomys, Mylomys rex
 Genus Pelomys - groove-toothed creek rats
 Bell groove-toothed swamp rat, Pelomys campanae
 Creek groove-toothed swamp rat, Pelomys fallax
 Hopkins's groove-toothed swamp rat, Pelomys hopkinsi
 Issel's groove-toothed swamp rat, Pelomys isseli
 Least groove-toothed swamp rat, Pelomys minor
 Genus Rhabdomys (Four-striped Grass Mouse)
 Rhabdomys dilectus
 Four-striped grass mouse, Rhabdomys pumilio
 Dasymys division
 Genus Dasymys - shaggy swamp rats
 Glover Allen's shaggy rat, Dasymys alleni
 Crawford-Cabral's shaggy rat, Dasymys cabrali
 Cape shaggy rat, Dasymys capensis
 Fox's shaggy rat, Dasymys foxi
 Dasymys griseifrons
 African marsh rat, Dasymys incomtus
 Dasymys longipilosus
 Montane shaggy rat, Dasymys montanus
 Angolan marsh rat, Dasymys nudipes
 Robert's shaggy rat, Dasymys robertsii
 West African shaggy rat, Dasymys rufulus
 Rwandan shaggy rat, Dasymys rwandae
 Dasymys shortridgei
 Tanzanian shaggy rat, Dasymys sua

 Golunda division
 Genus Golunda (Indian bush rat)
 Indian bush rat, Golunda ellioti

 Hybomys division
 Genus Dephomys - defua rats
 Defua rat, Dephomys defua
 Ivory Coast rat, Dephomys eburneae
 Genus Hybomys - hump-nosed mice
 Eisentraut's striped mouse, Hybomys badius
 Father Basilio's striped mouse, Hybomys basilii
 Moon striped mouse, Hybomys lunaris
 Miller's striped mouse, Hybomys planifrons
 Temminck's striped mouse, Hybomys trivirgatus
 Peters's striped mouse, Hybomys univittatus
 Genus Stochomys (Target Rat)
 Target rat, Stochomys longicaudatus

 Oenomys division
 Genus Grammomys
 Arid thicket rat, Grammomys aridulus
 Grammomys brevirostris
 Bunting's thicket rat, Grammomys buntingi
 Gray-headed thicket rat, Grammomys caniceps
 Mozambique thicket rat, Grammomys cometes
 Woodland thicket rat, Grammomys dolichurus
 Forest thicket rat, Grammomys dryas
 Giant thicket rat, Grammomys gigas
 Ruwenzori thicket rat, Grammomys ibeanus
 Eastern rainforest grammomys or eastern rainforest thicket rat, Grammomys kuru
 Macmillan's thicket rat, Grammomys macmillani
 Ethiopian thicket rat, Grammomys minnae
 Shining thicket rat, Grammomys poensis
 Genus Lamottemys
 Mount Oku rat, Lamottemys okuensis
 Genus Oenomys - rufous-nosed rats
 Common rufous-nosed rat, Oenomys hypoxanthus
 Ghana rufous-nosed rat, Oenomys ornatus
 Genus Thallomys - acacia rats
 Loring's rat, Thallomys loringi
 Black-tailed tree rat, Thallomys nigricauda
 Acacia rat, Thallomys paedulcus
 Shortridge's rat, Thallomys shortridgei
 Genus Thamnomys - thicket rats
 Kemp's thicket rat, Thamnomys kempi
 Hatt's thicket rat, Thamnomys major
 Charming thicket rat, Thamnomys venustus

Fossil genera 

 Arvicanthis division
 Genus †Canariomys - Canary Islands giant rats (Pleistocene to Holocene of the Canary Islands)
 †Tenerife giant rat, Canariomys bravoi 
 †Gran Canaria giant rat, Canariomys tamarani 

 †Parapelomys (Pliocene of India, Pakistan, Arabia, and Ethiopia)
 †Parapelomys robertsi 
 †Saharamys (Late Miocene of Egypt)
 †Saharamys misrensis
 †Saidomys (Pliocene of Egypt, Ethiopia, Kenya, and possibly Afghanistan)
 †Saidomys afarensis
 †?Saidomys afghanensis (alternately placed in Karnimata)
 †Saidomys natrunensis
 †Saidomys parvus

References 

Old World rats and mice
Mammal tribes